Greece–Palestine relations are bilateral relations between the Hellenic Republic and the State of Palestine. Due to the historical ties between the two countries, Greece and Palestine today enjoy excellent diplomatic relations. Palestine has a representative office in Athens and Greece's consulate general in Jerusalem is accredited to Palestine. The two countries are members of the East Mediterranean Gas Forum.

History
The Philistines, who resided in the southern coast of Palestine, were originally from the Greek island of Crete. At one point, both countries fell under the complete control of the Ottoman Empire.

Greece's diplomatic relations were founded with the PLO in 1981, while relations with Israel were maintained only at the consular level until Greece's formal recognition of Israel in 1990 under Mitsotakis. Since the formation of current foreign policy under George Papandreou, Greece has seen a rapid improvement in relations with Israel, following the deterioration of Israel's relations with Turkey caused by the Gaza flotilla raid.

In 2001, there were 4,000 Palestinians residing in Greece.

Diplomatic recognition
Greece has not fully formalized its relations with Palestine due to many geopolitical disputes, despite the pledges of then-Prime Minister Alexis Tsipras who is a member of the left-wing Syriza Party known for its support for the Palestinian cause, to make such changes.

In December 2015, the Hellenic parliament voted unanimously in the presence of President Mahmoud Abbas to recommend to the government the full recognition of the state of Palestine on 4 June 1967 borders with East Jerusalem as its capital.

Palestinian issue
President Karolos Papoulias has stated that Greece ultimately supports the creation of a Palestinian state alongside Israel. Under previous governments, Greece garnered a reputation as a staunch supporter of the Palestinian cause. Within the wider Arab–Israeli conflict, Andreas Papandreou maintained a stronger stand against Israel than any other government in the European Community.

See also
 Foreign relations of Greece
 Foreign relations of Palestine

References 

Palestine
Greece
Greece–State of Palestine relations